Ronald Sandlin is an American internet marketer who took part in the January 6 United States Capitol attack. 

In December 2022, he was jailed for 63 months after pleading guilty to his crimes and fined $2,000. A few days later, the judge increased the fine by $20,000.

Early life 
Sandlin was born in Mexico to a father who was a chemical engineer and a mother who was a school teacher.

Career and views 
Sandlin worked as an internet marketer.

He is a Donald Trump supporter and believed there was mass voter fraud in the 2020 United States presidential election.

Capitol attack 
In the days prior to the January 6 United States Capitol attack, Sandlin used Facebook to share a photo of fellow insurrectionist Josiah Colt holding a firearm with the caption "My fellow patriot sleeping ready for the boogaloo on Jan. 6." Sandlin, Colt, and Nathaniel DeGrave then drove to Washington, D.C. in a rented car and, according to US federal prosecutors, brought "gas and face masks, helmets, shin guards, protective gear, one Glock pistol, a bodyguard pocket pistol, knives, a slingshot, a handheld taser/stun gun, an expandable baton, walkie talkies and two cans of bear mace".

On January 6, 2020, Sandlin trespassed into the United States Capitol building where he attempted to forcibly remove a police officer's helmet, removed an oil painting from the wall, stole a book, and smoked marijuana. Sandlin filmed himself telling police officers "You’re going to die, get out of the way!"

He was arrested in Las Vegas on January 29, 2021. During his February 1, 2021, pre-trial hearing, he pleaded with the judge to be allowed to stay with his parents while awaiting trial, but was remanded in custody. While in detention awaiting trial, Sandlin threatened a prison worker with a chair. While in jail awaiting trial, Sandlin announced that he was working out a deal with Netflix to sell footage filmed by him on January 6. He also claimed to have met with Dinesh D'Souza and to have discussed his activities with podcaster Joe Rogan.

Sandlin pleaded guilty to assaulting, resisting or impeding police officers and to conspiracy to obstruct an official proceeding on September 30, 2022. He was sentenced to 63 months in prison and fined $2,000. In court, he expressed remorse and regret. After court discussions about an online fundraising campaign that Sandlin organised, the judge fined him an extra $20,000.

Personal life 
Sandlin was aged 35 in 2022. Sandlin normally lived in Las Vegas, but had been living in Millington, Tennessee since 2020.

He owes $500,000 in unpaid taxes.

References

External links 
 Ronnie Sandlin Twitter

Living people
Mexican emigrants to the United States
Internet marketing people
1980s births
Convicted participants in the January 6 United States Capitol attack
People from Millington, Tennessee
People from Las Vegas